Picrocleidus is an extinct genus of plesiosaur. It is known only from the combinatio nova of the type species Muraenosaurus beloclis Seeley 1892, P. beloclis from the Middle Jurassic Oxford Clay Formation (Callovian stage) of the United Kingdom.

See also

 Timeline of plesiosaur research

References

Middle Jurassic plesiosaurs of Europe
Fossil taxa described in 1892
Cryptoclidids
Taxa named by Harry Seeley
Sauropterygian genera